2K13 may refer to:

 the year 2013
 Major League Baseball 2K13, 2013 video game
 NBA 2K13, 2012 video game